Sir Benegal Rama Rau CIE, ICS (1 July 1889 – 13 December 1969) was the fourth Governor of the Reserve Bank of India from 1 July 1949 to 14 January 1957.

Early life and family
He was born in a Konkani-speaking Chitrapur Saraswat Brahmin family from Mangaluru. His elder brother Sir Benegal Narsing Rau went on to become an Indian civil servant, jurist, diplomat and statesman known for his key role in drafting the Constitution of India, and his younger brother B Shiva Rao became a journalist and politician.

He was educated at Presidency College of Madras, and at King's College in Cambridge.

He married Dhanvanthi Rama Rau, of Kashmiri Brahmin descent and a leader in the Indian women's rights movement who was the International President of Planned Parenthood and the founder of Family Planning Association of India, their younger daughter Santha Rama Rau became a travel writer, marrying and settling in the United States.

Career
Joining the Indian Civil Service in 1919, he was appointed a Companion of the Order of the Indian Empire (CIE) in 1930, and was knighted in 1939. He was a member of the Indian Civil Service. While he had the longest tenure as Governor of the RBI, it was cut short when he resigned just before the expiry of his second extended term, due to differences with Finance Minister T. T. Krishnamachari. 

On joining the ICS and before joining the RBI he held the following posts.
 Under-Secretary and Deputy Secretary to the Government of Madras (1919–1924)
 Finance Department (1925–1926) as Secretary to the Indian Taxation Committee
 Finance Department (1926–1928) as Deputy Secretary
 Simons Commission (1928–1930) as Financial Adviser
 Industries Department Joint Secretary
 Round Table Conference as Secretary
 Indian Bill (1931–1934) in the Joint Select Committee of Parliament
 Deputy High Commissioner for India in London (1934–1938)
 High Commissioner for India in South Africa (1938–1941)

When he returned to India he was appointed Chairman of the Bombay Port Trust (1941–1946). After serving in the post he once again served as a diplomat as the Indian Ambassador to Japan (1947–1948), and as the Ambassador to the United States (1948–1949). His last position was as the Governor of the Reserve Bank of India. He has been the longest-serving R.B.I Governor to date.

References

1889 births
1969 deaths
Mangaloreans
People from Dakshina Kannada district
Knights Bachelor
Indian Knights Bachelor
Companions of the Order of the Indian Empire
Governors of the Reserve Bank of India
Indian bankers
Indian civil servants
Indian Civil Service (British India) officers
Presidency College, Chennai alumni
1947
Ambassadors of India to the United States
20th-century Indian judges
Konkani people
High Commissioners of India to South Africa
University of Madras alumni
20th-century Indian economists